Kitak is an island in the Sermersooq municipality in southeastern Greenland.

In 1961 the German weather ship WBS 11 Hessen was renamed 'Kitak'.

Geography 
The island is located on the western side of the entrance of the Sermilik Fjord.
There is a sheltered bay in the NW side of Kitak that is reportedly a good anchorage for ocean-going vessels.

The archipelago is separated from the mainland by narrow sounds, one of which is named 'Ikasartik'. The Suunikajik island cluster is located 4 km to the west.   

The nearest inhabited settlement is Tasiilaq, the most populous community on the eastern coast and the seventh-largest town in Greenland, located on Ammassalik Island on the other side of the fjord about 40 km to the east-northeast.

References

External links 
Map of Ammassalik Island

Islands of Greenland